King Bee is a jazz-funk band, formed in Newcastle upon Tyne UK in 2011. Its members consist of Dave Wilde (Saxophones, flute, vocals, synths), Chris Jelly (Vibraphone), Dan Brady (Bass), Martin Douglas (Drums), Richard Burns (Trumpet), Steve Glendinning (Guitar).

The band was formed by Dave Wilde (former member and writer with Smoove & Turrell) and Chris Jelly, with Dan Brady joining shortly after. The band has toured extensively in the UK including Edinburgh's Jazz Bar, Manchester's Band on the Wall and Matt & Phreds, Mostly Jazz Festival Birmingham, The Lanes in Bristol and Newcastle's Hoochie Coochie and Boilershop.

Tracks from debut album 'King Bee' have received airplay from BBC 6Music's Craig Charles Funk and Soul Show, Jazz FM, Robert Elms' show on BBC Radio London and Solar Radio.

Emrys Baird reviewed 'King Bee' (the album) on the Blues and Soul website, stating: "This much heralded debut album should remain a true testament to their musical prowess. This engrossing Geordie outfit play with passion encompassing Jazz, Funk and smoking grooves which are stamped all over this certified classic."

A 7" vinyl release of 'Money Gone' topped Juno's funk vinyl charts in late 2015. It featured a remix by Smoove on the B-side, which Craig Charles included in his ‘Best of 2015’ show, calling it “a revelation”.
Current 12" vinyl release "Bee to the Flower" features a remix by French DJ/Producer The Reflex and is issued in association with Hoochie Coochie Newcastle.

Second album currently recording

Discography 

"King Bee" (2014) – album, Beeswax Records (CD, iTunes and Amazon)

"Money Gone" (2015) - single, Beeswax Records (vinyl, kingbeefunk.com)

"Bee to the Flower" (2016) - 12" single, with remix by The Reflex (vinyl)Beeswax Records

External links 
 Official King Bee website
 King Bee on Facebook
 King Bee's BBC Playlister profile
 King Bee's MusicBrainz profile

References

Jazz-funk musicians
English funk musical groups